The 36th District of the Iowa House of Representatives in the state of Iowa.

Current elected officials
Marti Anderson is the representative currently representing the district.

Past representatives
The district has previously been represented by:
 Elizabeth Ruby Miller, 1971–1973
 Mary O'Halloran, 1973–1979
 Marvin E. Diemer, 1979–1983
 Thomas J. Jochum, 1983–1993
 Pat Murphy, 1993–2003
 Swati Dandekar, 2003–2009
 Nick Wagner, 2009–2013
 Marti Anderson, 2013–present

References

036